East Kilbride Football Club is a semi-professional football club based in East Kilbride, South Lanarkshire, Scotland. They are members of the Lowland Football League, in the fifth tier of the Scottish football league system.

Formed in 2010 with the intention of bringing senior football to one of Scotland's largest towns, the club initially competed in amateur football before becoming one of the founder members of the Lowland League in 2013. The club became a full member of the Scottish Football Association (SFA) in 2014, entitling them to automatic entry to the Scottish Cup.

History
The club was launched officially by two former Old Firm players, John Hartson and John Brown, once of Celtic and Rangers respectively. The club was resurrected after folding in the 19th century, having been initially founded in 1871.

Original club
The original club was formed in 1871, making it one of the earliest formed clubs in Scotland. The first office bearers included the quaintly titled Croupier, which today would be recognised as Treasurer. The first recorded match was a 1–0 defeat by a Queen's Park second eleven in April 1872. They drew 0–0 with the same team later that year. During the 1870s the club folded and resurrected several times, which was a regular occurrence at that time for football clubs. The original club colours were navy and gold according to evidence from the SFA Museum of Football. The original club did not have a badge, which was customary at the time too. The team played at Kirktonholme in 1876, winning three, losing nine and drawing three games. The team played at Show Park in 1877 and had a better season, winning six, losing six and drawing six. The club participated in some of the earliest editions of the Scottish Cup in seasons 1878–79 and 1879–80, going out in the first round in both seasons.

2010s
The modern club was formed in May 2010 after the merger of Jackton Boys Club and Stewartfield FC. Later local clubs EK Diamonds and EK Wanderers were incorporated into the structure. As yet they have no permanent home so they use the facilities at the training base, K-Park, until a site is found for a new stadium. They played in the inaugural season of the Lowland League, although they had previously been elected to the South of Scotland League at the end of the 2012–13 season.
Two men, tycoon James Kean and Iain King, who is a sports journalist, spent many years in the hope that East Kilbride Thistle (the town's former highest ranked football team) would become a senior sports team so much that they officially launched their youth development programme from under-21s right down to the under-5s. The dream never materialised and they had to admit defeat, and so their vision was to form a new club. John Hartson, the former Celtic striker, was appointed honorary president of the new club. On 10 September 2010, the club held their inaugural fundraising dinner which was attended by around 250 people and raised about £9500.

The team played in the Scottish Amateur Football League until their election into the senior leagues in June 2013. They won the Division 2 title in 2011–12 and were crowned Division 1 champions in 2012–13. On 31 May 2013, East Kilbride were given a place in the South of Scotland League for season 2013–14. On 17 June 2013, East Kilbride were elected to play in the newly formed Lowland League, without playing a game in the South of Scotland League. Their first league fixtures were a 2–1 defeat at Stirling University (10th) and a 1–0 home win over Whitehill Welfare (13th) in August 2013. The Kilby completed a debut season as a senior team with a Lowland League mid-table finish, winning the South Region Challenge Cup and reaching the Lowland League Cup semi finals. They claimed their maiden trophy as a senior team with a 2–0 Final victory over Dalbeattie Star at Palmerston on 24 May 2014. They were granted full SFA membership in April 2014 and therefore could enter the Scottish Cup from season 2014–15. Their first Scottish Cup tie was a 1–0 first round win at Lothian Thistle on 13 September 2014. After a draw at Spartans in the next round, East Kilbride suffered a heavy home defeat in the replay. In only their second season in the Lowland League, East Kilbride secured a second-place finish with two games left, with a defeat of Edinburgh University in their final home game. A 3–1 defeat of Gretna 2008 in the Lowland League Cup final on 17 May 2015, delivered a second cup success in as many seasons.

On 5 November 2016, East Kilbride defeated BSC Glasgow 3–1 for a 27th consecutive victory and surpassed Ajax's record of 26 consecutive wins. On 19 November 2016, East Kilbride lost 0–1 to Spartans to end their winning streak at 30 games. East Kilbride won the 2016–17 Lowland League, and progressed to a promotion/relegation playoff with Scottish League Two club Cowdenbeath. They missed out on promotion to the SPFL after losing a penalty shootout. In that period, defender Craig Howie became the first player to make 100 appearances for the club, having made his debut aged 17 in 2013.

East Kilbride would go on to win their second Lowland League title during the 2018–19 season, beating defending champions Spartans at K Park to clinch the trophy. They lost to Cove Rangers in the SPFL promotion playoffs.

Current squad

On loan

Coaching staff

Badge
The badge for the new club features the oystercatcher bird and also the colour red, symbols of St Bridgit, after whom East Kilbride is named, cill being the Gaelic word for a religious cell, which was the common form of ancient Celtic religious organisation, thus Kilbride being the religious cell associated with St Bridgit/St Bride; East to distinguish from West Kilbride in Ayrshire.

John Hartson Foundation Trophy
The John Hartson Foundation Trophy is annual pre-season match at the K-Park between East Kilbride and another side, with all proceeds going towards Hartson's testicular cancer charity. The first match between East Kilbride and Fort William was supposed to take place on 20 July 2013, but Fort William cancelled the day before due to a shortage of players. The match did take place for the first time on 19 July 2014, with a strong Celtic under-20 team defeating East Kilbride 5–1.

Season-by-season record

Lowland League

† Season curtailed due to coronavirus pandemic.

Honours
League
Lowland League
Champions (2): 2016–17, 2018–19
Runners up (3): 2014–15, 2017–18, 2020–21
Scottish Amateur Football League Division 1
Champions: 2012–13
Scottish Amateur Football League Division 2
Champions: 2011–12

Cup
SFA South Region Challenge Cup:
Winners (3): 2013–14, 2016–17, 2018–19
Lowland League Cup
Winners (3): 2014–15, 2015–16, 2021–22
East of Scotland Qualifying Cup
Winners (2): 2015–16, 2017–18
East of Scotland City Cup
Winners: 2015–16
SAFL Coronation Cup
Runners up: 2012–13

See also
:Category:East Kilbride F.C. players
:Category:East Kilbride F.C. managers

References

External links
 Official Club Website
 Facebook
 Twitter
 Daily Record
 Website of the K-Park Training Academy

 
Association football clubs established in 2010
Football clubs in Scotland
Football in South Lanarkshire
East Kilbride
2010 establishments in Scotland
South of Scotland Football League teams
Lowland Football League teams